Joseph Conrad Schneider (11 September 1926 – 15 March 2013) was a New Zealand rower.

Biography
Born on 11 September 1926, Schneider became a cabinet maker.

Both Schneider and Des Simonson were members of the Aramoho Rowing Club in Whanganui, where they were coached by the former world professional single scull champion, William Webb. Schneider was twice New Zealand champion in single sculls, first at the 1948 New Zealand Rowing Championships in Port Chalmers and then the 1950 championships in Wanganui. With Simonson, he won several national championships in double sculls.

At the 1950 British Empire Games in Auckland, Schneider (stroke) and Simonson (bow) won the silver medal in the men's double sculls. They finished with a time of 7:32, 10 seconds behind the winning Australian crew.

Schneider died in Whanganui on 15 March 2013, and his ashes were buried in Aramoho Cemetery.

References

1926 births
2013 deaths
New Zealand male rowers
Rowers at the 1950 British Empire Games
Commonwealth Games silver medallists for New Zealand
Commonwealth Games medallists in rowing
Burials at Aramoho Cemetery
Medallists at the 1950 British Empire Games